The Grand Hotel is a landmark located at Yuanshan (圓山) in Zhongshan District, Taipei, Taiwan. The hotel was established in May 1952 and the main building was completed on October 10, 1973. It is owned by the Duen-Mou Foundation of Taiwan, a non-profit organization, and has played host to many foreign dignitaries who have visited Taipei.

It was also the tallest building in Taiwan from 1973 to 1981.

History

After Chiang Kai-shek's retreat to Taiwan in 1949, Chiang felt it was difficult to accommodate foreign ambassadors due to the lack of five-star hotels in Taipei. He wanted to build an extravagant hotel that would cater to foreign guests. His wife Soong Mei-ling (Madame Chiang) suggested  building it on the old Taiwan Hotel on Yuanshan Mountain, the site of the ruins of the Taiwan Grand Shrine, a Shinto shrine during the Japanese rule. Chiang decided on a Chinese palace-style architecture to promote Chinese culture to the West through its extravagance. Taipei-based architect Yang Cho-Cheng was responsible for the design of the new hotel.

The hotel was established in May 1952, but it was expanded several times before it became the landmark as it is known  today. The swimming pool, tennis court, and the membership lounge were constructed in 1953, and the Golden Dragon Pavilion and Golden Dragon Restaurant opened in 1956. The Jade Phoenix Pavilion and Chi-Lin Pavilion opened in 1958 and 1963, respectively. In 1968 the hotel was rated as one of the world's top ten hotels by the US Fortune magazine. Finally, on the Double Tenth Day in 1973, the main Grand Hotel building was completed and became an instant Taipei icon.

In June 1995 a disastrous fire broke out on the roof of the main building during necessary reconstruction and refurbishment. As neither ladders nor high pressure pumps could reach the fire, the roof and the upper floors were destroyed. Not until 1998 did the hotel recover from the damage and fully reopen to the public. Following the fire, the two dragon heads on the roof were rotated 180 degrees to point inwards. As dragons are traditionally a symbol of rain and water, this was intended to symbolize preparedness against a future fire.

Features

General features
With its vermilion columns, the roof makes the hotel a visible showcase of Chinese architecture and culture. The hotel itself contains numerous objets d'art, wall panels, paintings, carvings, and significant restaurants.  Dragon motifs are frequently intertwined throughout the various structures that make up the hotel, earning the hotel the name "The Dragon Palace". Besides dragons, lion and plum flower motifs also make a significant presence in the hotel.

Each of the eight guest levels represents a different Chinese dynasty, as reflected through the murals and general decor. The hotel has a total of 490 rooms. The rooms facing south offer guests a panoramic view of Taipei City. The presidential suite, as the hotel claims, contains former President Chiang Kai-shek's desk and Madame Chiang's dressing table. Currently the presidential suite costs NT$160,000 per night (Approx. US$4,850). Budget rooms are available from ca. $99 per night.

The hotel also features auditoriums and meeting rooms, making it a popular venue for conventions and conferences in Taiwan.

Secret passages
Ever since the opening of the hotel, rumour had it that secret passages ran from the hotel to the nearby Shilin Official Residence and farther out to the Presidential Office Building for Chiang's convenience. The truth was uncovered after the 1995 fire as part of the safety commission that was conducted. The secret passages were revealed to be two air-raid tunnels, each of them 180 m in length leading to nearby parks, not to the presidential residence or the emergency headquarters as rumours had suggested. The western passage is equipped with a slide for the disabled as an alternative to the spiraling stairs. The exits are obscured by concrete walls, thus escaping public detection for decades. The tunnels have a maximum capacity of about 10,000 people.

As of 2005 the tunnels were closed to the public except for special events, when hotel officials invite the press and public inside the tunnels for a tour.

Notable guests
 Dwight D. Eisenhower – The only American president who visited Taiwan (18-19 June 1960) while still in power.
 Richard Nixon – Stayed at the hotel during an Asian trip in 1965
 President of the Republic of Vietnam, Nguyễn Văn Thiệu and his wife
 Ronald Reagan
 Bill Clinton
 Warren Christopher – His arrival from nearby Sungshan Airport in 1978 was delayed several hours by crowds throwing eggs and screaming protests over U.S. President Jimmy Carter's decision to break relations with Taiwan.
Benigno "Ninoy" Aquino, Jr. – Stayed at the hotel the night before his assassination on August 21, 1983
 Nelson Mandela
 Margaret Thatcher
 Shigeru Yoshida
 Shah of Iran Mohammad Reza Pahlavi
 King Hussein of Jordan
 Lee Kuan Yew – Stayed at least 14 times and once was so impressed with the level of service that he requested that the hotel butler accompany him throughout his visit to Taiwan.
 The King of Thailand, Bhumibol Adulyadej and his wife, Queen Sirikit Kitiyakara, 1963

Notable events
 Sixth Chen–Chiang summit (20–22 December 2010)
 House of Bishops Meeting of the Episcopal Church (17–23 September 2014)

In popular culture
 The Taipei Grand Hotel was featured in the 1994 film Eat Drink Man Woman by Taiwanese film director Ang Lee.
 A level in the 2010 videogame Alpha Protocol is set here.
 Major Motoko Kusanagi stays at the hotel in an episode of Ghost in the Shell: S.A.C. 2nd GIG.
 A scene from the third-season premiere of the American sitcom Fresh off the Boat was filmed in the hotel.
 The hotel's lobby hosted the Finish Line for the third season of the Israeli edition of The Amazing                                                                                                                                                   
Race.

Gallery of images

See also

 Kaohsiung Grand Hotel
 List of tallest buildings in Taiwan

References

 "Visiting the Taipei Grand Hotel, Uncovering the Truth behind Chiang's Secret Passages", by Wu Yaming and Chen Xiaoxing, Global Times, December 23, 2002, retrieved January 31, 2006

External links

The Grand Hotel – Official website
Emporis – Grand Hotel Taipei
SkyscraperPage – Grand Hotel

State guesthouses
Hotels in Taipei
Chinese architectural history
Hotel buildings completed in 1973
Hotels established in 1952
1973 establishments in Taiwan
1952 establishments in Taiwan